Ocotea jelskii is a species of tree in the family Lauraceae. It is native to Ecuador, Peru and Bolivia.

References

jelskii
Trees of Peru